The Affiliated Senior High School of National Chung Hsing University is a senior high school in Dali District, Taichung, Taiwan.

See also
 Education in Taiwan

External links 
 http://www.dali.tc.edu.tw/

1997 establishments in Taiwan
High schools in Taiwan
Educational institutions established in 1997
National Chung Hsing University
Schools in Taichung